Orthosphinctes is a genus of ammonites belonging to the order Ammonitida family Ataxioceratidae.

They lived in the late Jurassic period, in the Kimmeridgian age, which occurred 155.7-152.1 million years ago. These shelled ammonoids were nektonic, fast-moving and carnivore.

Fossils distribution
Jurassic of Algeria, France, India, Iran, Italy, Madagascar, Spain, Yemen.

Gallery

References

Jurassic ammonites
Ammonites of Europe
Kimmeridgian life
Ammonitida genera
Perisphinctoidea